Fauth is a surname. Notable people with the surname include:

Evelyn Fauth (born 1976), Austrian tennis player
Gerald Fauth, American consultant and government official 
Gerhard Fauth (1915–2003), German journalist
Julian Fauth, Canadian blues pianist, singer and songwriter
Jürgen Fauth (born 1969), German-American film critic, translator, editor, photographer, and author